Oulton Broad North railway station is on the Wherry Lines in the east of England, and is one of two stations serving Oulton Broad, Suffolk.

The station building dates from 1847. Today it is managed by Greater Anglia, which also operates all trains that call, but the station is unstaffed.

The tracks from Lowestoft split into the two separate lines to Norwich and Ipswich just before Oulton Broad North. Trains to Ipswich pass Oulton Broad North closely, but there has never been a platform for them to call there. The Ipswich trains call at Oulton Broad South, which is about three-quarters of a mile by road to the south.

Services
As of December 2018, the typical Monday-Saturday off-peak service at Oulton Broad North is as follows:

References

External links 

Railway stations in Suffolk
DfT Category F2 stations
Former Great Eastern Railway stations
Greater Anglia franchise railway stations
Railway stations in Great Britain opened in 1847
1847 establishments in England
Lowestoft